Peter Tait (17 October 1936 – 18 July 1990) was an English professional footballer who played as a striker in the Football League for York City, and in non-League football for Scarborough, Bridlington Town, Goole Town, Dunnington and Bridlington Trinity.

References

1936 births
Footballers from York
1990 deaths
English footballers
Association football forwards
York City F.C. players
Scarborough F.C. players
Bridlington Town A.F.C. players
Goole Town F.C. players
Bridlington Trinity F.C. players
English Football League players